The 70th Golden Globe Awards honoring the best in film and television of 2012, was broadcast live from the Beverly Hilton Hotel in Beverly Hills, California on January 13, 2013, by NBC. Tina Fey and Amy Poehler co-hosted. Nominations were announced on December 13 by Jessica Alba, Megan Fox and Ed Helms. The Cecil B. DeMille Award, honoring the lifetime achievements of actors and filmmakers, was announced on November 1, 2012, with Jodie Foster being the latest recipient of that trophy. The ceremony was produced by Dick Clark Productions in association with the Hollywood Foreign Press Association.

Winners and nominees

These are the nominees for the 70th Golden Globe Awards. Winners are listed at the top of each list.

Film

Films with multiple nominations
The following 12 films received multiple nominations:

Films with multiple wins
The following 3 films received multiple wins:

Television

Series with multiple nominations
The following 18 series received multiple nominations:

Series with multiple wins
The following 3 series received multiple wins:

Presenters

 Jessica Alba and Kiefer Sutherland with Best Actor – Miniseries or Television Film
 Aziz Ansari and Jason Bateman with Best Actress in a Television Series – Comedy or Musical
 Christian Bale introduced Silver Linings Playbook
 Kristen Bell and John Krasinski with Best Supporting Actor – Series, Miniseries or Television Film
 Halle Berry with Best Director – Motion Picture
 Josh Brolin introduced Moonrise Kingdom
 Don Cheadle and Eva Longoria with Mr. and Miss Golden Globe, Best Actress – Miniseries or Television Film and Best Miniseries or Television Film
 Bill Clinton introduced Lincoln
 George Clooney with Best Actress in a Motion Picture – Drama and Best Actor in a Motion Picture – Drama
 Sacha Baron Cohen with Best Animated Feature Film
 Bradley Cooper and Kate Hudson with Best Supporting Actor – Motion Picture
 Rosario Dawson introduced The Best Exotic Marigold Hotel
 Robert Downey Jr. with the Cecil B. DeMille Award
 Jimmy Fallon and Jay Leno with Best Television Series – Comedy or Musical
 Will Ferrell and Kristen Wiig with Best Actress in a Motion Picture – Musical or Comedy
 Nathan Fillion and Lea Michele with Best Actress in a Television Series – Drama
 Megan Fox and Jonah Hill with Best Supporting Actress – Motion Picture
 Jamie Foxx introduced Django Unchained
 Jennifer Garner with Best Actor in a Motion Picture – Musical or Comedy
 John Goodman and Tony Mendez introduced Argo
 Salma Hayek and Paul Rudd with Best Actor in a Television Series – Drama and Best Television Series – Drama
 Dustin Hoffman with Best Motion Picture – Musical or Comedy
 Jeremy Irons introduced Salmon Fishing in the Yemen
 Lucy Liu and Debra Messing with Best Actor in a Television Series – Comedy or Musical
 Jennifer Lopez and Jason Statham with Best Original Score and Best Original Song
 Robert Pattinson and Amanda Seyfried with Best Screenplay
 Dennis Quaid and Kerry Washington with Best Supporting Actress – Series, Miniseries or Television Film
 Jeremy Renner introduced Zero Dark Thirty
 Julia Roberts with Best Motion Picture – Drama
 Liev Schreiber introduced Life of Pi
 Arnold Schwarzenegger and Sylvester Stallone with Best Foreign Language Film
 Catherine Zeta-Jones introduced Les Misérables

References

External links
 
 
 

070
2012 film awards
2012 television awards
Golden Globe
January 2013 events in the United States